The Fast and the Furious: Tokyo Drift  is a 2006 action film directed by Justin Lin and written by Chris Morgan. It is the standalone sequel to The Fast and the Furious (2001) and 2 Fast 2 Furious (2003) and is the third main installment in the Fast & Furious franchise. It stars Lucas Black and Bow Wow.  In the film, car enthusiast Sean Boswell (Black) is sent to live in Tokyo with his estranged father and finds solace exploring the city's drifting community.

A third Fast & Furious film was confirmed in June 2005, when Lin was selected as director. Morgan was hired after an open call soon after, thus marking the first film in the franchise's longtime association with Lin, Morgan, actor Sung Kang, and composer Brian Tyler. Unable to secure the returns of any of the original cast, development instead increased focus on car culture and street racing. Principal photography began in August 2005 and lasted until that November, with filming locations including Los Angeles and Tokyo, making Tokyo Drift the first film in the franchise to feature an international filming location.

The Fast and the Furious: Tokyo Drift was theatrically released in the United States on June 16, 2006, by Universal Pictures. The film received mixed reviews from critics, with praise for its driving sequences but criticism for its screenplay and acting performances. Tokyo Drift grossed $159 million worldwide, making it the lowest-grossing film in the franchise. It was followed by a standalone sequel film, Fast & Furious (2009).

Plot

Troubled high school student Sean Boswell and athlete Clay race their cars, a 1970 Chevrolet Monte Carlo, and a 2003 Dodge Viper. Sean cuts through a structure and catches up to Clay. Desperate to win, Clay hits Sean's car repeatedly until they reach a high-speed turn, which causes both cars to crash; Clay's Viper hits a cement pipe, and Sean's Monte Carlo rolls. Clay's wealthy family helps him escape punishment, but because Sean is a repeat offender, to avoid jail he is sent to live in Japan with his father, a U.S. Navy officer stationed in Tokyo.

In Tokyo, Sean befriends Twinkie, a military brat who introduces him to the world of drift racing. After driving to an underground car show in Twinkie's 2005 Hulk-themed Volkswagen Touran, Sean has a confrontation with Takashi—the Drift King (DK) who drives a 2003 Nissan 350Z—over Sean talking to Takashi's girlfriend, Neela. Though barred from driving, Sean decides to race against Takashi, who has ties to the Yakuza, in a 1999 Nissan Silvia S15 Spec-S loaned by a racer named Han, but loses his first race with Takashi due to his unfamiliarity with drifting.

To repay his debt for the car he destroyed, Sean agrees to work for Han, who drives a 1994 Veilside Fortune Mazda RX-7. They become friends, and Han offers to teach Sean how to drift, explaining that he is helping Sean as he is the only person willing to stand up to Takashi. Sean soon masters drifting by practicing in a 2006 Mitsubishi Lancer Evolution IX, gaining respect after defeating DK's right-hand man, Morimoto. Sean soon asks Neela out on a date, and learns that after her mother died, she moved in with Takashi's grandmother, which resulted in their relationship. An enraged Takashi beats Sean up the next day, telling him to stay away from Neela; Neela subsequently leaves Takashi and moves in with Sean and Han.

Takashi's uncle Kamata, the head of the Yakuza, reprimands Takashi for allowing Han to steal from him. Takashi and Morimoto confront Han, Sean, and Neela about the thefts. Twinkie causes a distraction, allowing Han, Sean, and Neela to flee, who are then pursued by Takashi and Morimoto. During the chase, Morimoto crashes, leaving Takashi to pursue the trio on his own. Han allows Sean to overtake him to hold Takashi off, but the chase ends when Sean and Neela crash. Meanwhile, moments after escaping, Han's car is broadsided by a Mercedes and explodes, before Sean has a chance to save Han.

Takashi, Sean, and his father become involved in an armed standoff which is resolved by Neela agreeing to leave with Takashi. Sean's father prepares to send him back but Sean pleads him to let him fix his own mess. His father agrees and they make amends. Twinkie gives his money to Sean to replace the money Han stole from Takashi, which Sean then returns to Kamata. Sean proposes a race against Takashi, with the loser having to leave Tokyo. Kamata agrees to the challenge, on the condition that the race take place on the mountain which Takashi himself has been the only person to descend successfully. Sean and Han's crew restore a 1967 Ford Mustang Fastback that Sean's father was working on to drift specification, using several components of the previously wrecked Silvia, including the engine.

That night, on the mountain, crowds gather to see the race; Takashi takes the lead initially, but Sean's training allows him to catch up. Takashi repeatedly rams Sean's car, eventually misses, and drives off the mountain while Sean crosses the finish line, with Takashi's car almost falling on him in the process. Kamata keeps his word, and lets Sean remain in Tokyo; Sean is dubbed the new Drift King. Later, Neela, Twinkie, and Sean, now driving a 2001 Nissan Silvia S15 Spec R, are enjoying themselves at another car show. Dominic Toretto shows up to challenge Sean in a 1970 Plymouth Road Runner, and Sean accepts after Dom proclaims that Han was family.

Cast

 Lucas Black as Sean Boswell: A young man interested in street racing.
 Bow Wow as Twinkie: Sean's first friend he meets in Tokyo and who sells various consumer goods and introduces Sean to drift racing.
 Sung Kang as Han Lue: DK's business partner and old friend of Dominic Toretto, who befriends Sean and teaches him how to drift.
 Brian Tee as Takashi: Sean's enemy who is acknowledged as the best drift racer and given the title "Drift King", or simply "D.K.".
 Nathalie Kelley as Neela: Takashi's girlfriend who later falls for Sean.
 Sonny Chiba (credited as JJ Sonny Chiba) as Kamata: Takashi's uncle who is the head of the Yakuza.
 Leonardo Nam as Morimoto: Takashi's right-hand man.
 Brian Goodman as Major Boswell: Sean's father.
 Zachery Ty Bryan as Clay: The quarterback of Sean's school whom Sean races at the beginning of the film.
 Lynda Boyd as Ms. Boswell: Sean's mother who is fed up with moving them around and sends him to Tokyo, Japan to live with his father.
 Jason Tobin as Earl Hu: One of Han's friends who specializes in tuning the cars, along with Reiko.
 Keiko Kitagawa as Reiko: Earl's friend and fellow tuner.
 Nikki Griffin as Cindy: Clay's girlfriend, who suggests that Clay and Sean race to win her.
 Satoshi Tsumabuki as Exceedingly Handsome Guy: Who starts the first race between Sean and Takashi (cameo)
 Keiichi Tsuchiya as an elderly fisherman (uncredited cameo)
 Kazutoshi Wadakura as an elderly fisherman (uncredited cameo)
 Vin Diesel as Dominic Toretto (uncredited cameo)

Character development post the events of Tokyo Drift 
The four main characters—Han Lue, Sean Boswell, Twinkie and Earl Hu—returned to the series in F9, and it was confirmed by some sources that the latter three would appear in its sequel, Fast X, with Lue confirming to return. As of the time of F9, Boswell, Twinkie and Hu had left Japan and were involved in rocket development for the German Military, in Germany. How they came from their circumstances of the Japanese drift scene to their work in the Military Industry is not explained in the series. They are shown testing rockets by attaching them to the top of motor vehicles.

Production

Development

Writer Chris Morgan was a fan of the series, and the producers had an open writing call for the third film. Morgan originally pitched Dominic Toretto in Tokyo, learning to drift and solving a murder.

Neal H. Moritz, who had produced the two previous installments, began working on the film in 2005. On June 8, 2005, Moritz hired Justin Lin to direct The Fast and the Furious: Tokyo Drift. Lin, who wasn't intimately familiar with drifting when he was approached to helm the project, recalled: "I was in film school when The Fast and the Furious came out, and I saw it along with a sold-out crowd who just ate it up. What really excited me about directing this film was the chance to harness that energy—create a whole new chapter and up the ante by bringing something new to the table for the audience who loves action and speed." Lin was not enthusiastic at first and was unimpressed by earlier drafts of the script, saying "I think it's offensive and dated, and I don't have any intention of doing it." The producers allowed him to develop the film in his own way, although it was a constant challenge and he was always battling the studio to make the film better, he said "to their credit, they were very fair and reasonable."

It was impossible to get the necessary filming permits in Tokyo, so they went ahead without permission. "I wanted to shoot in Shibuya, which is the most crowded place in Tokyo. The cops, they're all so polite, so it takes ten minutes for them to come over and kick you out." Unknown to Lin the studio had hired a fall guy, who stepped in when the police came to arrest him, and said he was the director and spent the night in jail instead.

Following respectable test screenings of The Fast and the Furious: Tokyo Drift, Universal still felt it needed a star cameo; Vin Diesel agreed to reprise his role as Dominic Toretto for a brief cameo, in exchange for Universal's ownership to rights of the Riddick series and character, in lieu of financial payment.

Technical

Races and stunts were coordinated by second unit director Terry Leonard. The film used almost 250 vehicles, cutting up 25 and destroying more than 80.

The Nissan Silvia which Sean trashes in his first race in Japan is depicted as having an RB26DETT engine swap which itself is donated to the Ford Mustang. However, the car in the movie was actually powered by the Silvia's original engine. The Veilside body-kitted Mazda RX-7, (dubbed "Fortune"), driven by Han was originally built by Veilside for the 2005 Tokyo Auto Salon, but was later bought by Universal and repainted from dark red, to orange and black, for use in the movie. The car in which Dominic appears in at the end of the film is a highly customized 1970 Plymouth Road Runner, which was built for the SEMA Show.

SCC magazine tested the cars of the film, and noted that the cars in Tokyo Drift were slightly faster in an acceleration match up with the cars from 2 Fast 2 Furious.

Notable drifting personalities Keiichi Tsuchiya, Rhys Millen, and Samuel Hübinette were consulted and employed by the movie to provide and execute the drifting and driving stunts in the film. Nobushige Kumakubo, Kazuhiro Tanaka, Tanner Foust, Rich Rutherford, Calvin Wan and Alex Pfeiffer were also brought in as none of Universal's own stunt drivers could drift. Some racing events were filmed within the Hawthorne Mall parking lot in Los Angeles, as filming in Tokyo required permits the studio was unable to obtain. They instead used street lights and multiple props to help recreate Tokyo.

Toshi Hayama was also brought in to keep elements of the film portrayed correctly, who was contacted by Roger Fan, an old high school friend who starred in Lin's Better Luck Tomorrow. Hayama ensured certain references were deployed correctly, such as the use of nitrous oxide in straights but not in turns, and keeping the use of references to sponsors to a minimum. One of Kamata's henchmen has missing fingers, a punishment typically deployed by the Yakuza. He had to have the missing fingers digitally added in to appease cultural concerns.

Music

Original Motion Picture Soundtrack, composed of 12 songs, was released on June 20, 2006 through Universal Motown. It features contributions from Don Omar, Teriyaki Boyz, Atari Teenage Riot, Brian Tyler, DJ Shadow, Dragon Ash, Evil Nine, Far East Movement, Mos Def, N⋆E⋆R⋆D, Tego Calderón and The 5.6.7.8's. Brian Tyler's Original Score was released on June 27 via Varèse Sarabande, a week after Original Motion Picture Soundtrack.

Reception

Box office
Tokyo Drift brought in over $23 million on its opening weekend, placing at #3 behind Cars ($33.7 million) and Nacho Libre ($28.3 million). The film itself was in limited release in Japan (released under the name Wild Speed 3). The US box office was $62,514,415, and it grossed another $96,450,195 internationally, resulting in total receipts of $158,964,610. According to opening weekend polling by Universal the audience was 58% male and 60% under 25.

Critical response
The Fast and the Furious: Tokyo Drift gained a 38% approval rating on Rotten Tomatoes based on reviews from 138 critics; the average rating is 5/10. The site's consensus reads: "Eye-popping driving sequences coupled with a limp story and flat performances make this Drift a disappointing follow-up to previous Fast and Furious installments." On Metacritic, the film has a weighted average score of 46 out of 100 based on reviews from 31 critics, indicating "mixed or average reviews". Audiences surveyed by CinemaScore gave the film a grade A− on scale of A to F.

Roger Ebert of the Chicago Sun-Times praised the film, giving it three out of four stars, saying that director Justin Lin "takes an established franchise and makes it surprisingly fresh and intriguing," adding that Tokyo Drift is "more observant than we expect" and that "the story [is] about something more than fast cars". Michael Sragow of The Baltimore Sun felt that "the opening half-hour may prove to be a disreputable classic of pedal-to-the-metal filmmaking" and "the last downhill race is a doozy." Kirk Honeycutt of The Hollywood Reporter said that "it's not much of a movie, but a hell of a ride". Todd McCarthy of Variety gave the film a positive review and praised the "good, old-fashioned genre filmmaking done in a no-nonsense, unpretentious style", adding it "stays in high gear most of the way with several exhilarating racing sequences, and benefits greatly from the evocative Japanese setting." McCarthy particularly praised the work of stunt coordinator Terry J. Leonard.

Michael Medved gave Tokyo Drift one and a half stars out of four, saying: "There's no discernible plot, or emotion, or humor, but the final race is well-staged and nicely shot. ... The main achievement of this vapid time-waster involves its promotion of new appreciation for the first two movies in the series." James Berardinelli wrote: "When it comes to eye candy, the film is on solid ground—it offers plenty of babes and cars (with the latter being more lovingly photographed than the former). However, it is unacceptable that the movie's action scenes (races and chases) are boring and incoherent. If the movie can't deliver on its most important asset, what's the point?" Richard Roeper strongly criticized the film, saying, "The whole thing is preposterous. The acting is so awful, some of the worst performances I've seen in a long, long time." Ethan Alter of Premiere magazine was particularly critical of Black's character: "during the course of this movie, Sean makes so many dumb decisions it's a wonder that anyone wants to be associated with him." Peter Travers of Rolling Stone said that Tokyo Drift "suffers from blurred vision, motor drag and a plot that's running on fumes. Look out for a star cameo—it's the only surprise you'll get from this heap." Mick LaSalle of the San Francisco Chronicle thought "It quickly tanks, thanks to a lead character with no goals, focus, appeal or intelligence and a lead actor who's just a little too convincing at playing a dunce", adding: "As for the racing scenes, who cares about the finesse move of drifting, compared to going fast? And who wants to watch guys race in a parking lot?" Matt Singer of Village Voice called it "a subculture in search of a compelling story line, and Black's leaden performance makes you pine for the days of Paul Walker."

Rob Cohen, who directed the first film of the series, was very critical of this film, saying: "If you were to just watch Tokyo Drift, you'd say 'I never want to see anything related to Fast & Furious again.'"

Retrospective reviews

In critics' rankings of the series, Tokyo Drift had in the past often appeared on the bottom of the list. However, over time it has been seen more favorably, and was ranked second best by IndieWire, The Washington Post, TheWrap, Screen Rant, and Collider. Esquire magazine and BuzzFeed News ranked it the best of the series. It has become a favorite with car enthusiasts, seen as the one movie most specifically dealing with car culture and focusing on actual cars. Critics and fans have come to appreciate Tokyo Drift for introducing Sung Kang and Justin Lin to the franchise, and enjoyed the simple story, stylish direction, and that the film never takes itself too seriously. As the film series became more elaborate and incorporated less realistic storylines including heists and spying, the relative simplicity of Tokyo Drift has become more appreciated by critics. Tokyo Drift has been described as "the movie that kept the series alive" since "Vin Diesel abandoned his other projects, and came back — with Lin at the helm". In a 2020 interview, Christopher Nolan said that although the first film was his favorite, he had a "soft spot" for Tokyo Drift.

Accolades

Legacy

Initially seen as a one-off character in an almost straight-to-DVD release, Han Lue became a fan favorite due to his portrayal by Sung Kang and was brought back by director Justin Lin. Following Tokyo Drift, Han is retroactively introduced as a member of Dominic Toretto's crew in the next trilogy of films in the franchise: Fast & Furious (2009), Fast Five (2011), and Fast & Furious 6 (2013), each of which are set prior to Tokyo Drift.

Subsequent films have pivoted around Han's Tokyo Drift car crash scene: Fast & Furious 6 foreshadowed that the crash was no accident; Furious 7 (2015) featured a new villain, Deckard Shaw, who intercepted Han during the street race; and F9 (2021) reveals how and why Han's death was staged. 

Following Lin's continuing work with the series, he attempted to bring back Lucas Black, with media reports that Black had signed on for a succession of movies. Black returned for Furious 7 in a minor role and was used to establish the story of Han's death, and indicated that he wanted his character's continuing story to be told for the fans, and that he was willing to be involved past his appearance in F9. Lin succeeded in getting all four main actors from Tokyo Drift—Kang, Black, Wow and Tobin—to return to the franchise in F9.

References

External links

 Official site 
 
 
 Behind the Scenes of The Fast and the Furious: Tokyo Drift

2006 films
2006 action thriller films
2000s chase films
2000s coming-of-age films
2006 crime thriller films
2000s road movies
American action thriller films
American coming-of-age films
American chase films
American road movies
American sequel films
2000s Japanese-language films
Films about Chinese Americans
Films about Japanese Americans
Films about Taiwanese Americans
Fast & Furious films
Films about automobiles
Films directed by Justin Lin
Films produced by Neal H. Moritz
Films scored by Brian Tyler
Films set in Arizona
Films set in Tokyo
Films shot in Los Angeles
Films shot in Tokyo
Original Film films
Relativity Media films
Universal Pictures films
Films with screenplays by Chris Morgan
Yakuza films
Japan in non-Japanese culture
2000s English-language films
2000s American films